Allison McKenzie  is a Scottish TMA Awards nominated actress from Glasgow. As a youngster she went to The Mitchell Theatre for Youth and discovered her love of acting. She fulfilled a childhood ambition when she worked with the Royal Shakespeare Company in their 2016/2017 season at Swan Theatre, Stratford-upon-Avon.

TV Credits
 Our House - ITV 1 - (2022), Role - Lucy Myers
 Crime  by Irvine Welsh - Britbox - (2021), Role - Estelle
  The Victim (2019 TV series)  – BBC 1 - Director Niall MacCormick – Writer Rob Williams, Role - Cathy
  Press (TV series)  - (2018) - BBC 1 - Director Tom Vaughan - Writer Mike Bartlett, Role - Kelly 
Shetland (TV series) (Series 4 Ep 1) – BBC 1 – (2018) – Directed by Lee Haven Jones, Role - Gail Callahan 
 Armchair Detectives (TV series)  – BBC1 – (2017), Role - Patricia Frint (1 episode)
 Beowulf (TV series) – ITV 1 – (2016) – Directed by Colin Teague, Role - Arla
 Doctors – (BBC 1) – Small Deaths – Directed by Adrian Bean – (June 2014), Role - DS Katherine Palmer
 Line of Duty (series 2)  – (BBC 2 ) – (2014) – Directed by Douglas MacKinnon & Daniel Nettheim, Role - DS Jayne Akers 
  M.I. High – 1 episode (2014) – BBC1 – Created by Keith Brumpton, Role - Vivian Glitch 
  Bob Servant Independent  – (2013) – BBC 4, Role - Sally Donaldson
 Doctors – (2011) – BBC 1 – Just Like A Woman, Role - Katrina Bryne/Steve
 Sadie J – Tidylicious – (2011) – BBC 1, Role - Lorna
 River City – BBC One Scotland – (2002 - 2007), Role - Joanne Rossi, (Former Series Regular) 
 Rebus – (2004) – STV – Dead Souls, Role - Helen
 Attachments – (2003) – BBC 2 – Gym Virgin, Role - Alison
It's Just a Habit – BBC, Role - Susan
 Taggart – STV – (2000) – Football Crazy, Role - Candice Marie

Film Credits
 Family Portrait (Short Film) – (2016) – Director Kelly Holmes – Writer Nils Gustenhofen, Role - Margaret 
 Swung (2014) Writer Ewan Morrison – Director Colin Kennedy  – Produced by Sigma, Role - Marcia
 The Virtual Network (Short film) – (2012) – Directed by Bryan Larkin – Dabhand Films, Role - Litza
 Airborne – Directed by Dominic Burns, Role - Agent Millward
 Parkarma (Short film) – (2011) – Directed by Bryan Larkin – Dabhand Films, Role - Allison
 Casting (Short film) – (2007) – SMG – Directed by Roderick Smith, Role - Emelia
 The Aficionado – (2005) – Antonine Production – Directed by Alan de Pallett, Role - Mandy
 Loved, Alone (Short film) – (2003) – Dark Cloud Productions – Directed by Indra Bhose, Role-Brooke
 16 Years of Alcohol – (2003) – 16 Years Limited – directed by Richard Jobson, Role - Beth
 Club le Monde – (2002) – OutLaw Films – directed by Simon Rumley, Role - Ali

Theatre Credits
  The Butterfly Lion  written by Michael Morpurgo in a new adaptation by Anna Ledwich - Directed by Dale Rooks -  Minerva Theatre, Chichester at  Chichester Festival Theatre - (October/November 2019), Role - Isobel/Nanny 
   Wilderness  written by Kellie Smith - Hampstead Theatre at Hampstead Downstairs - (March/April 2019), Role - Stephanie 
  The Seven Acts of Mercy written by Anders Lustgarten – Royal Shakespeare Company – 24 November 2016 – 10 February 2017 – Directed by Erica Whyman –  Swan Theatre, Stratford-upon-Avon, Role - Lavinia
 The Rover (play)  written by Aphra Behn – Royal Shakespeare Company – (8 September 2016 – 11 February 2017) – Directed by Loveday Ingram –  Swan Theatre, Stratford-upon-Avon, Role - Moretta
 Two Noble Kinsmen written by William Shakespeare  & John Fletcher – Royal Shakespeare Company – (17 August 2016 – 7 February 2017) – Directed by Blanche McIntyre – Swan Theatre, Stratford-upon-Avon, Role - Hippolyta
 The Lion, the Witch and the Wardrobe – by C.S Lewis - Birmingham Repertory Theatre – Directed by Tessa Walker – (19 November 2015 – 16 January 2016), Role - The White Witch 
 Macbeth by William Shakespeare – Trafalgar Studios – Directed by Jamie Lloyd (director) , Role - Lady Macduff/Witch – (Feb–April 2013) -(Olivier Nomination for Best Revival) 
 Doctor in the House –  adapted by Ted Willis - Directed by Ian Talbot, Role - Aussie – (2012 UK No1 Tour)  also based on Doctor in the House (TV series) and Doctor in the House (novel) by Richard Gordon 
 The Snow Queen – by Stuart Paterson - Royal Lyceum Theatre, Edinburgh - Directed by Mark Thompson, Role - The Snow Queen – (2010/11)
 Macbeth by William Shakespeare – Royal Lyceum Theatre, Edinburgh & Nottingham Playhouse - Directed by Lucy Pitman Wallace, Role - Lady Macbeth (2008)
 Witchcraft – Finborough Theatre, London - Written by Joanna Baillie - Directed by Bronwen Carr, Role - Lady Annabella – (2008)
 James and the Giant Peach – By Roald Dahl, Adapted by David Wood - Citizens Theatre, Glasgow - Directed by Jeremy Raison, Role - Aunt Spiker & Miss Spider – (2006)
 Hamlet by William Shakespeare – Brunton Theatre, Musselburgh, Directed by Mark Thompson, Role - Ophelia- (2001) 
 Cabaret – Dundee Rep - Directed by Hamish Glen, Role - Sally Bowles - (2000) 
 Sexual Perversity in Chicago – by David Mamet - Directed by Alexander West - Dundee Rep, Role - Joan Webber - (2000) 
 All My Sons by Arthur Miller – Directed by Richard Baron- Dundee Rep, Role- Lydia Lubey - (2000) 
 Playboy of the Western World by John Millington Synge – Dundee Rep - Directed by Jim Culleton, Role -  Susan Brady - (2000) 
 The Princess and the Goblin – by Stuart Paterson - Directed by Hugh Hodgart- Dundee Rep, Role - Various - (1999/2000) 
 A Midsummer Night's Dream – by William Shakespeare - Dundee Rep - Directed by Hamish Glen, Role - Helena - (1999)

Radio & Audio Credits
 Big Finish Productions  Survivors (Series 2) - Audio Drama Series by Matt Fitton, Ken Bentley & Louise Jameson - Directed by Ken Bentley - (Released in 2015), Role - Patricia Gallagher. Based on the  Survivors (1975 TV series) 
 Big Finish Productions  - Doctor Who Audio Adventure - The Cloisters Of Terror by Jonathan Morris - Directed by Nicholas Briggs -(4th Doctor story released in 2015), Role- Lynn Pickering 
 Big Finish Productions  - Doctor Who Audio Adventure - An Eye For Murder by Una McCormack - Directed by Nicholas Briggs - (6th Doctor story released in 2014), Role - Dr Joan Dalton. 
 Big Finish Productions  - Doctor Who Audio Adventure – Breaking Bubbles by L M Myles, Mark Ravenhill, Una McCormack & Nev Fountain – Directed by Nicholas Briggs - (6th Doctor story released in 2014), Role - Tondra. 
 Big Finish Productions  – The Fifth Doctor Box Set – Doctor Who Audio Adventure  – Iterations of I by John Dorney - Directed by Ken Bentley - (5th Doctor story released in 2014), Role - Imogen Fraser
  Waverley(The Great Scot) - by Walter Scott - Radio 4 Audio Drama - (2013), Role - Flora & Mrs Bates

References

3. https://www.rsc.org.uk/the-seven-acts-of-mercy

4.https://www.dailyrecord.co.uk/entertainment/tv-radio/scots-actress-allison-mckenzie-reveals-7320482.amp
5.https://www.sundaypost.com/fp/the-script-is-amazing-the-cast-is-terrific-and-best-of-all-my-clothes-are-from-paul-smith-whats-not-to-likeshetland-star-reveals-delight-at-latest-tv-role-as-fleet-street-editor/amp/
6.https://glasgowtheatreblog.com/tag/macbeth/
7.https://www.bigfinish.com/contributors/v/Allison-McKenzie-2165
9.https://www.dailyrecord.co.uk/entertainment/tv-radio/line-duty-scots-heart-tv-3259383
10.https://www.dailyrecord.co.uk/incoming/gallery/meet-stars-line-duty-3258781
11.https://www.hampsteadtheatre.com/news/2019/february/full-wilderness-cast-announced/
12. https://www.rsc.org.uk/the-seven-acts-of-mercy/meet-the-characters
13. https://www.cft.org.uk/archive/the-butterfly-lion-2019
14.https://finboroughtheatre.co.uk/production/witchcraft
15.https://www.pressreader.com/uk/evening-times/20061213/282527243947028
16.https://www.dailyrecord.co.uk/entertainment/celebrity/ive-always-said-i-would-try-1099871. 
amp
17.http://www.jeffholmes.co.uk/synopsis_rivercity.html
18.https://booksfromscotland.com/book/10-years-of-river-city-behind-the-scenes-of-scotlands-favourite-tv-drama/

External links
 
 

Living people
Scottish television actresses
Year of birth missing (living people)
Scottish stage actresses
Scottish film actresses
Alumni of Queen Margaret University
Place of birth missing (living people)